Printzina is a genus of green algae. in the family Trentepohliaceae.

Species
Printzina lagenifera (Hildebrandt) Thompson et Wujek.

Description
Appears as small, reddish cushion-like masses. Consisting of entangled filaments of globular or elliptical cells 6 - 12μm wide.. It forms reddish streeks.

References

External links

Trentepohliaceae
Ulvophyceae genera